Francis of Assisi Church is a Roman Catholic church located in the Planoise area in Besançon, Doubs, France. It was built during the 20th century.

History 
The church was built in the beginning of the 1970s by Maurice Novarina, a famous French architect who built also the sector of Époisses in Planoise. This building is the only church of the area and was inaugurated in 1972. Before, the Christians went to Roy farm, before the construction of Micropolis. 

Just a hundred church-goers attend this church, but once the monument received up to four priests. The architecture of the church is contemporary, a fresco composed of a 33,000-piece mosaic is located at the entry of the church.

See also 
 Planoise
 Besançon

References 
  Planoise-Reflexion: Francis of Assisi church (View the 26/09/09)

Planoise
Buildings and structures in Besançon
Churches in Doubs
Roman Catholic churches in Besançon